Alfred Krammer was an Austrian sprint canoer who competed in the early 1950s. He won a bronze medal in the K-4 10000 m event at the 1950 ICF Canoe Sprint World Championships in Copenhagen.

References

Austrian male canoeists
Living people
Year of birth missing (living people)
ICF Canoe Sprint World Championships medalists in kayak